Many gases have toxic properties, which are often assessed using the LC50 (median lethal concentration) measure. In the United States, many of these gases have been assigned an NFPA 704 health rating of 4 (may be fatal) or 3 (may cause serious or permanent injury), and/or exposure limits (TLV, TWA or STEL) determined by the ACGIH professional association. Some, but by no means all, toxic gases are detectable by odor, which can serve as a warning. Among the best known toxic gases are carbon monoxide, chlorine, nitrogen dioxide and phosgene.

Definition
Toxic: a chemical that has a median lethal concentration (LC50) in air of more than 200 parts per million (ppm) but not more than 2,000 parts per million by volume of gas or vapor, or more than 2 milligrams per liter but not more than 20 milligrams per liter of mist, fume or dust, when administered by continuous inhalation for 1 hour (or less if death occurs within 1 hour) to albino rats weighing between 200 and 300 grams each.
Highly Toxic: a gas that has a LC50 in air of 200 ppm or less.
NFPA 704: Materials that, under emergency conditions, can cause serious or permanent injury are given a Health Hazard rating of 3. Their acute inhalation toxicity corresponds to those vapors or gases having LC50 values greater than 1,000 ppm but less than or equal to 3,000 ppm. Materials that, under emergency conditions, can be lethal are given a Health Hazard rating of 4. Their acute inhalation toxicity corresponds to those vapors or gases having LC50 values less than or equal to 1,000 ppm.

List

Notes 

 Decomposes in gaseous form.
 Explodes in gaseous form.

See also
 List of Schedule 1 substances (CWC)
 List of extremely hazardous substances
 List of gases

References

External links 

 OSHA Limits for Air Contaminants
 OSHA Permissible Exposure Limits
 California Department of Industrial Relations Permissible Exposure Limits for Chemicals

Chemical safety
Highly toxic gases
G